A sednoid is a trans-Neptunian object with a perihelion well beyond the Kuiper cliff at . These objects lie outside an apparently nearly empty gap in the Solar System and have no significant interaction with the planets. They are usually grouped with the detached objects. Some astronomers, such as Scott Sheppard, consider the sednoids to be inner Oort cloud objects (OCOs), though the inner Oort cloud, or Hills cloud, was originally predicted to lie beyond 2,000 AU, beyond the aphelia of the four known sednoids.

Unexplained orbits
The sednoids' orbits cannot be explained by perturbations from the giant planets, nor by interaction with the galactic tides. If they formed in their current locations, their orbits must originally have been circular; otherwise accretion (the coalescence of smaller bodies into larger ones) would not have been possible because the large relative velocities between planetesimals would have been too disruptive. Their present elliptical orbits can be explained by several hypotheses:

 These objects could have had their orbits and perihelion distances "lifted" by the passage of a nearby star when the Sun was still embedded in its birth star cluster.
 Their orbits could have been disrupted by an as-yet-unknown planet-sized body beyond the Kuiper belt such as the hypothesized Planet Nine.
 They could have been captured from around passing stars, most likely in the Sun's birth cluster.

Known members

The first three known sednoids, like all of the more extreme detached objects (objects with semi-major axes > 150 AU and perihelia > 30 AU; the orbit of Neptune), have a similar orientation (argument of perihelion) of ≈ 0°. This is not due to an observational bias and is unexpected, because interaction with the giant planets should have randomized their arguments of perihelion (ω), with precession periods between 40 Myr and 650 Myr and 1.5 Gyr for Sedna. This suggests that one or more undiscovered massive perturbers may exist in the outer Solar System. A super-Earth at 250 AU would cause these objects to librate around ω =  for billions of years. There are multiple possible configurations and a low-albedo super-Earth at that distance would have an apparent magnitude below the current all-sky-survey detection limits. This hypothetical super-Earth has been dubbed Planet Nine. Larger, more-distant perturbers would also be too faint to be detected.

With an aphelion over 2100 AU, it brings the object further out than Sedna.

In late 2015, V774104 was announced at the Division for Planetary Science conference as a further candidate sednoid, but its observation arc was too short to know whether its perihelion was even outside Neptune's influence. The talk about V774104 was probably meant to refer to Leleākūhonua even though V774104 is the internal designation for non-sednoid .

Malena Rice and Gregory Laughlin applied a targeted shift-stacking search algorithm to analyze data from TESS sectors 18 and 19 looking for candidate outer solar system objects. Their search recovered known objects like Sedna and produced 17 new outer Solar system body candidates located at geocentric distances in the range 80–200 AU, that need follow-up observations with ground-based telescope resources for confirmation. Early results from a survey with WHT aimed at recovering these distant TNO candidates have failed to confirm two of them.

Theoretical population
Each of the proposed mechanisms for Sedna's extreme orbit would leave a distinct mark on the structure and dynamics of any wider population. If a trans-Neptunian planet were responsible, all such objects would share roughly the same perihelion (≈80 AU). If Sedna had been captured from another planetary system that rotated in the same direction as the Solar System, then all of its population would have orbits on relatively low inclinations and have semi-major axes ranging from 100–500 AU. If it rotated in the opposite direction, then two populations would form, one with low and one with high inclinations. The perturbations from passing stars would produce a wide variety of perihelia and inclinations, each dependent on the number and angle of such encounters.

Acquiring a larger sample of such objects would therefore help in determining which scenario is most likely. "I call Sedna a fossil record of the earliest Solar System", said Brown in 2006. "Eventually, when other fossil records are found, Sedna will help tell us how the Sun formed and the number of stars that were close to the Sun when it formed." A 2007–2008 survey by Brown, Rabinowitz and Schwamb attempted to locate another member of Sedna's hypothetical population. Although the survey was sensitive to movement out to 1,000 AU and discovered the likely dwarf planet Gonggong, it detected no new sednoids. Subsequent simulations incorporating the new data suggested about 40 Sedna-sized objects probably exist in this region, with the brightest being about Eris's magnitude (−1.0).

See also
Trans-Neptunian objects category

References

External links

New icy body hints at planet lurking beyond Pluto